Kritike: An Online Journal of Philosophy is a biannual peer-reviewed interdisciplinary and international journal of philosophy published by the Department of Philosophy, University of Santo Tomas. The editors-in-chief are Paolo Bolaños and Roland Theauas Pada. The journal publishes both articles and book reviews. Its focus lies on interdisciplinary approaches to philosophy, especially Filipino philosophy, oriental thought and East-West comparative philosophy, continental philosophy, and Anglo-American philosophy.

Journal articles are published in either English or Filipino.

Abstracting and indexing
The journal is abstracted and indexed in The Philosopher's Index, Web of Science, Scopus, MLA Bibliography, Humanities International Complete, Humanities International Index, International Directory of Philosophy, ASEAN Citation Index, and Directory of Open Access Journals.

See also
List of philosophy journals

References

External links

University of Santo Tomas
Philosophy journals
English-language journals
Biannual journals
Open access journals
Online-only journals
Publications established in 2007
2007 establishments in the Philippines